Bolshekachakovo (Olo Qasaq) is a rural locality (a village) and the administrative centre of Bolshekachakovsky Selsoviet, Kaltasinsky District, Bashkortostan, Russia. The population was 510 as of 2010. There are 5 streets.

Geography 
Bolshekachakovo is located 27 km southeast of Kaltasy (the district's administrative centre) by road. Malokachakovo is the nearest rural locality.

References 

Rural localities in Kaltasinsky District